

History
The Michelin Guide was first published in 1900 in France, to promote driving. In 1926, it began to specialise in fine dining reviews, introducing a single star system. The current three star system began in 1931, although three stars were not awarded until the 1933 edition.

The first women chef to hold a Michelin star was Élisa Blanc in 1929.

The first women chefs to hold three Michelin stars came in that 1933 edition, namely Eugénie Brazier and Marie Bourgeois, although Brazier won three stars at both of her La Mère Brazier restaurants in Lyon and at Col de la Luère. She held all six for 20 years, and her record for holding the most stars stood until beaten by Alain Ducasse in 1998. It then stood as the record for a female chef, until Carme Ruscalleda won her seventh star across several restaurants.

Some female Michelin-starred chefs prefer not to make an issue out of their gender. For example, when three-star chef Dominique Crenn was named world's best female chef by the prestigious World's 50 Best Restaurants List in 2016, she was outraged, considering referring to her gender "diminishing, unnecessary and irrelevant".

Recent awards
Following the Second World War, Marguerite Bise became the third woman to win three Michelin stars, at her restaurant Auberge du Père Bise in 1950. It is then often reported that there was a 50-year gap before Anne-Sophie Pic became the fourth woman to win a set of three stars, despite Bise's granddaughter Sophie regaining the family restaurant's three stars in 1985, and similar awards made by Michelin to female chefs such as Nadia Santini, Elena Arzak and Clare Smyth in the interim.

While the number of women chefs with Michelin stars have been increasing in recent years, they are still relatively few in number. This is due in part to the percentage of female chefs; 4.7% of chefs in the United States are women, while the figure is 20% in the United Kingdom.  The low number of female chefs with stars has led to criticism of the Michelin Guide, alongside other issues such as the pay gap between male and female chefs.

The problem was raised with Michelin director Michael Ellis following the publication of the 2018 New York City edition, who said that the company "can't do anything" to resolve it. Subsequently, a spokesperson said "Increasingly, more women are entering the profession in this country and around the world. Michelin is not involved in culinary education or recruitment. We deeply value diversity of all kinds and are pleased to see the trend toward greater diversity in the culinary field."

List of female chefs with Michelin stars
Key
 This symbol denotes chefs who won a Michelin star as an executive chef under a Chef Patron, who is also considered to have won the star.
 This symbol denotes chefs who won a Michelin star as a co-executive chef alongside another chef.
§ This symbol denotes chefs who initially held stars under a Chef Patron or as a co-executive chef, but then later retained or earned those stars on their own.

See also

 List of chefs
 List of Michelin starred restaurants
 Lists of restaurants

Notes

References

Female chefs with Michelin stars
chefs with Michelin stars